The 2014 Internationaux Féminins de la Vienne was a professional tennis tournament played on indoor hard courts. It was the 18th edition of the tournament which was part of the 2014 ITF Women's Circuit, offering a total of $100,000 in prize money. It took place in Poitiers, France, on 20–26 October 2014.

Singles main draw entrants

Seeds 

 1 Rankings as of 13 October 2014

Other entrants 
The following players received wildcards into the singles main draw:
  Océane Dodin
  Amandine Hesse
  Mathilde Johansson
  Virginie Razzano

The following players received entry from the qualifying draw:
  Yuliya Beygelzimer
  Ons Jabeur
  Nadiia Kichenok
  Xenia Knoll

Champions

Singles 

  Tímea Babos def.  Océane Dodin 6–3, 4–6, 7–5

Doubles 

  Andrea Hlaváčková /  Lucie Hradecká def.  Katarzyna Piter /  Maryna Zanevska 6–1, 7–5

External links 
 2014 Internationaux Féminins de la Vienne at ITFtennis.com
  

2014 ITF Women's Circuit
Internationaux Féminins de la Vienne
2014 in French tennis
October 2014 sports events in France